The Bolton WtE is a waste power station constructed in 1971 in Bolton, and is a major landmark of its skyline. The plant is operated by Suez Recycling and Recovery UK. The Bolton incinerator is the only household waste incinerator in Greater Manchester.

See also

Greater Manchester Waste Disposal Authority
List of incinerators in the UK
Bolton power stations

References

External links
Greater Manchester Waste
Zero Waste Management Greater Manchester

Waste power stations in England
Buildings and structures in Bolton